Cranberry Lake is a hamlet in the eastern part of the Town of Clifton, in St. Lawrence County, New York, United States.  It lies along New York State Route 3 on the north shore of Cranberry Lake. The population was 200 at the 2010 census, which lists the community as a census-designated place.

Cranberry Lake, despite being one of the largest lakes in the Adirondacks, has mostly been preserved, because most of the land is owned by the state of New York. Cranberry Lake has many ponds and mountains with extensive hiking trails, such as the Cranberry Lake 50, a 50-mile hike around the Lake.

Geography

Demographics

References

External links
  DEC information about Cranberry Lake recreation facilities   
  Cranberry Lake Biological Station 
 Google books:  Smeby, Susan Thomas, Cranberry Lake and Wanakena
 The Cranberry Lake 50 hiking trail information

Hamlets in New York (state)
Census-designated places in New York (state)
Census-designated places in St. Lawrence County, New York
Hamlets in St. Lawrence County, New York